André Camille Jean Queillé (5 October 1931 – 13 December 2018) was a French boxer. He competed in the men's light middleweight event at the 1952 Summer Olympics.

References

1931 births
2018 deaths
French male boxers
Olympic boxers of France
Boxers at the 1952 Summer Olympics
Light-middleweight boxers